"En sten vid en sjö i en skog" / "Tuffa tider (för en drömmare)" is a double A-side single by Swedish pop group Gyllene Tider, released on May 19, 2004. The single peaked at number one on the Swedish singles chart.

Track listing
"En sten vid en sjö i en skog"
"Tuffa tider (för en drömmare)"

Charts

Weekly charts

Year-end charts

References 

2004 singles
Gyllene Tider songs
Songs written by Per Gessle
2004 songs
Capitol Records singles
Number-one singles in Sweden
Swedish-language songs